Katrineholms SK or KSK Bandy was a sports club in Katrineholm, Sweden, playing bandy.

The club was founded on 5 January 1919 and won the Swedish Bandy Championship for men three times, 1969, 1970 and 1972. and for women in 1974 and 1975. Home games were played at Backavallen.

In June 2007 the club was dissolved by amalgamating with Värmbol-Katrineholm BK, forming the new club Katrineholm Värmbol BS. The name Katrineholms SK is still used in association football.

Honours

Domestic
 Swedish Champions:
 Winners (3): 1969, 1970, 1972
 Runners-up (1): 1974

References

1919 establishments in Sweden
2007 disestablishments in Sweden
Defunct bandy clubs in Sweden
Sport in Katrineholm
Bandy clubs established in 1919
Sports clubs disestablished in 2007